The 2014 Boston Breakers season, is the club's ninth overall year of existence, fifth consecutive year, and second year as a member of the National Women's Soccer League.

Club

Kits

Executive staff

Coaching staff

Roster

Competitions

Key

Preseason

Regular season

Standings

Results summary

Squad statistics
Key to positions: FW – Forward, MF – Midfielder, DF – Defender, GK – Goalkeeper

See also 
 2014 National Women's Soccer League season
 2014 in American soccer

References 

2014 National Women's Soccer League season
American soccer clubs 2014 season
Boston Breakers seasons
2014 in sports in Massachusetts